Heptacarpus is a genus of shrimps in the family Thoridae. There are more than 30 described species in Heptacarpus.

Species
These 38 species belong to the genus Heptacarpus:

 Heptacarpus acuticarinatus Komai & Ivanov, 2008
 Heptacarpus brachydactylus (M.J.Rathbun, 1902) (island coastal shrimp)
 Heptacarpus brevirostris (Dana, 1852) (stout coastal shrimp)
 Heptacarpus camtschaticus (Stimpson, 1860) (northern coastal shrimp)
 Heptacarpus carinatus Holmes, 1900 (smalleye coastal shrimp)
 Heptacarpus commensalis Hayashi, 1979
 Heptacarpus cristata
 Heptacarpus decorus (M.J.Rathbun, 1902) (elegant coastal shrimp)
 Heptacarpus flexus (M.J.Rathbun, 1902) (slenderbeak coastal shrimp)
 Heptacarpus franciscanus (Schmitt, 1921) (Franciscan coastal shrimp)
 Heptacarpus fuscimaculatus Wicksten, 1986
 Heptacarpus futilirostris (Bate, 1888) (toy shrimp)
 Heptacarpus geniculatus (Stimpson, 1860) (flexed shrimp)
 Heptacarpus grebnitzkii (Rathbun, 1902)
 Heptacarpus herdmani (herdman coastal shrimp)
 Heptacarpus igarashii Hayashi & Chiba, 1989
 Heptacarpus jordani (Rathbun, 1902)
 Heptacarpus kincaidi (M.J.Rathbun, 1902) (Kincaid coastal shrimp)
 Heptacarpus layi (Owen, 1839)
 Heptacarpus littoralis Butler, 1980 (bigeye coastal shrimp)
 Heptacarpus longirostris (Kobyakova, 1936)
 Heptacarpus maxillipes (M.J.Rathbun, 1902) (Aleutian coastal shrimp)
 Heptacarpus minutus (Yokoya, 1930)
 Heptacarpus moseri (M.J.Rathbun, 1902) (alaska coastal shrimp)
 Heptacarpus palpator (Owen, 1839) (intertidal coastal shrimp)
 Heptacarpus paludicola Holmes, 1900 (California coastal shrimp)
 Heptacarpus pandaloides (Stimpson, 1860) (tsuno shrimp)
 Heptacarpus pictus (Stimpson, 1871) (redbanded clear shrimp)
 Heptacarpus pugettensis Jensen, 1983 (barred shrimp)
 Heptacarpus rectirostris (Stimpson, 1860)
 Heptacarpus sitchensis (Brandt, 1851) (red-banded transparent shrimp)
 Heptacarpus spina
 Heptacarpus stimpsoni Holthuis, 1947 (stimpson coastal shrimp)
 Heptacarpus stylus (Stimpson, 1864) (stiletto coastal shrimp)
 Heptacarpus taylori (Stimpson, 1857) (taylor coastal shrimp)
 Heptacarpus tenuissimus Holmes, 1900 (slender coastal shrimp)
 Heptacarpus tridens (M.J.Rathbun, 1902) (threespine coastal shrimp)
 Heptacarpus yaldwyni Wicksten, 1984

References

Further reading

 

Alpheoidea